is a 1995 Japan-exclusive Action role-playing video game for the Super Famicom.

Reception
On release, Famicom Tsūshin scored the game a 22 out of 40.

References

Role-playing video games
Action role-playing video games
Bandai games
Cooperative video games
Japan-exclusive video games
Super Nintendo Entertainment System games
Super Nintendo Entertainment System-only games
Video games developed in Japan
Multiplayer and single-player video games
1995 video games